Edward Settle Godfrey (October 9, 1843 – April 1, 1932) was a United States Army Brigadier General who received the Medal of Honor for leadership as a captain during the Indian Wars.

Early life and education
Godfrey was born October 9, 1843, in Ottawa, Ohio. He enlisted as a private in the Union Army at the beginning of the American Civil War. He served in Company D, 21st Ohio Infantry from April to August 1861.

He was admitted to the United States Military Academy at West Point two years later, and graduated in 1867.

Career
Godfrey joined the 7th U.S. Cavalry Regiment and as a lieutenant was a survivor of Battle of the Little Bighorn. He wrote an account of the battle and his experiences in it, originally published in Century Magazine in January 1892, which was highly influential in shaping perceptions of the battle and Custer's generalship. Despite being severely wounded at the Battle of Bear Paw Mountain against Chief Joseph and the Nez Perce Indians, September 30, 1877, Godfrey continued to lead his men in battle. He received the Medal of Honor in 1894 for his leadership actions during this battle.

Godfrey was breveted major on February 27, 1890. He served in Cuba in 1898 during the Spanish–American War and in the Philippine–American War overseas (1899–1902). He retired from the army on October 9, 1907, with the rank of Brigadier General.

At the ceremony of the burial of the Unknown Soldier from World War I in Arlington, Virginia, Godfrey led two platoons of Medal of Honor recipients as participants.

Godfrey died on April 1, 1932, at his home in the Cookstown section of New Hanover Township, New Jersey. He is buried at Arlington National Cemetery with his wife, Ida Emely Godfrey.

Marriage and family
His first wife died before the turn of the century. Their surviving children in 1932 were Mary Godfrey and E.S. Godfrey, Jr., who became a physician. On October 6, 1892, Edward  married Ida D. Emely Godfrey (1856–1941), his second wife.

Medal of Honor citation
Rank and organization: Captain, 7th U.S. Cavalry. Place and date: At Bear Paw Mountain, Mont., 30 September 1877. Entered service at: Ottawa, Putnam County, Ohio. Born: 9 October 1843, Ottawa, Ohio. Date of issue: 27 November 1894.

Citation:
Led his command into action when he was severely wounded.

See also

 List of Medal of Honor recipients
 List of Medal of Honor recipients for the Indian Wars

References

External links
 

1843 births
1932 deaths
People from Burlington County, New Jersey
People from Ottawa, Ohio
United States Army Medal of Honor recipients
Burials at Arlington National Cemetery
United States Military Academy alumni
United States Army generals
American Indian Wars recipients of the Medal of Honor
Battle of the Little Bighorn
Pine Ridge Campaign
People from Kalida, Ohio
Union Army soldiers